Astrogenes is a genus of moths belonging to the family Tineidae.

Species
Astrogenes chrysograpta Meyrick, 1921
Astrogenes insignata Philpott, 1930

References

External links

Tineidae
Tineidae genera
Taxa named by Edward Meyrick